Amphilophus chancho is a large cichlid fish endemic to Lake Apoyo in Nicaragua.

The six Amphilophus species found in Lake Apoyo show morphological differences.

Multiple species of this group have been identified and verified by genomic and mitochondrial DNA evidence in the volcanic crater lake Apoyo and another Nicaraguan crater lake, Xiloá. The genetic evidence from Apoyo supports a hypothesis that the six known species of the lake evolved via sympatric speciation. A few to perhaps several dozen species fitting the biological species concept are considered to exist among what has historically been called A. citrinellus, the great majority of which have not been described to date. The nine most recently described members of this species complex are considered endemic to their respective small, volcanic crater lakes.

References

 FishBase (2006) Eds. Froese, R. and D. Pauly. World Wide Web electronic publication. fishbase.org version (07/2006)

External links
 "Mojarras de Apoyo a Museo Smithsonian" (in Spanish) 
 "Hallan Nuevas Mojarras" (in Spanish)
 "El Nuevo Charco de Suenos de Darwin" (in Spanish)
 "The Little Apoyo Cichlid, Amphilophus astorquii"
 "Video of endemic Amphilophus cichlids in Laguna de Apoyo, Nicaragua" 
 "Amphilophus astorquii in a multspecies school" 
 "Nesting Amphilophus globosus photographed" 
 "Chancho Cichlid" 

chancho
Fish of Central America
Fish of Nicaragua
Taxa named by Jay Richard Stauffer Jr.
Taxa named by Jeffrey K. McCrary
Taxa named by Kristin E. Black
Fish described in 2008